The Algerine-class gunboats were a class of six 3-gun wooden gunboats (reclassified as gunvessels from 1859) built for the Royal Navy in 1857. A further pair were built in India for the Bombay Marine in 1859.

An enlarged version of the very numerous , they reflected the change in use from coastal operations towards deep-water cruising, but were delivered too late to see action in the Crimean War. They were the first class of Royal Navy gunboat to incorporate a hoisting screw, which gave them improved performance under sail. The last man hung from the yardarm in the Royal Navy was a Royal Marine executed on 13 July 1860 in Leven.

Design and construction
Developed during the Crimean War as an enlarged version of W. H. Walker's , the Algerines were an acknowledgement that gunboats designed for coastal operations would inevitably be called upon to act in a cruising role, both in shallow and in deeper water. Their increased size gave them much improved accommodation, and in general they were effective vessels, leading to the construction of two identical vessels for the Bombay Marine.

Armament
As built, they were armed with one  68-pounder (87 cwt) muzzle-loading smoothbore gun and two 24-pounder howitzers. By 1863 the three surviving vessels of the class were armed with one 110-pounder Armstrong breech-loading gun and one 40-pounder Armstrong breech-loading gun.

Propulsion
The class were each fitted with a 2-cylinder horizontal direct-acting single-expansion steam engine manufactured by Maudslay, Sons & Field. This engine drove a single screw, which for the first time in a gunboat was provided with a hoisting mechanism; this ensured a better performance under sail than previous classes. These engines were rated at 80 nominal horsepower and produced on trials .

Rig
Fitted at first with a simple schooner rig (often known as a "gunboat rig" in the Royal Navy), the use of these vessels as cruisers encouraged commanding officers on far-flung stations to augment their sail area by fitting topmasts and yards, making them barquentines.

Operational lives
Jaseur was lost on the Bajo Nuevo Bank in the Caribbean Sea within two years of her launch, having spent the whole of her short career on the North America and West Indies station, mostly in deterring the slave trade. Jasper also served on the West Indies station before being sold to the Chinese in 1863 to form part of Sherard Osborn's Vampire Fleet. When the venture was called off, she was sold to Egypt to prevent her purchase by the Confederate Navy. Algerine spent her entire career on the China station, and was present at the capture of Canton in 1857. Lee was also sent to the China station, but her career was abruptly curtailed on 25 June 1859 when she was sunk at the second battle of the Taku Forts. Leven, like Lee and Algerine served on the China station, and took part in the successful first battle of the Taku Forts. The last man hanged from the yardarm in the Royal Navy was a Royal Marine, executed for attempted murder on 13 July 1860 in Leven. Slaney served with Algerine at the capture of Canton and with Leven at the first battle of the Taku Forts.

Ships

Bombay Marine versions
Having proved their worth in the Royal Navy, two copies were built of teak at Bombay for the Bombay Marine.

Notes

References

 
 

 
 Algerine
Gunboat classes